Moving parts are machinery and engineering components.

It may also refer to:
Moving Parts, a 1970s band from Boston, Massachusetts
Fewer Moving Parts, a 2006 album by David Bazan
"Moving Parts" a song by Trixie Mattel from One Stone
"Now with Moving Parts" a 2018 concert tour by Mattel
Trixie Mattel: Moving Parts, a 2019 documentary film about Mattel